Nikolaj Bredahl Jacobsen (born 22 November 1971) is a Danish retired handball wing player and current coach of the Danish national team. He was named World Coach of the Year (male teams) in 2021 by IHF. He is the first manager for a national team to win three world championships in a row (2019-2023).

As a coach, Jacobsen won the 2013 Danish Handball League with Aalborg Håndbold, and led Rhein-Neckar Löwen to back-to-back German Handball-Bundesliga championships in the 2016 and 2017 season. He is the first Danish manager to win the German Bundesliga.  

During his playing career, Jacobsen predominantly played as a left wingman, and most prominently represented Danish team GOG Håndbold and German team THW Kiel. He won three Danish Handball League championships with GOG, as well as three Handball-Bundesliga championships and two European EHF Cup titles with Kiel. Jacobsen played a total 148 games and scored 584 goals for the Denmark men's national handball team from 1991 to 2003, and was named 1993 and 1999 Danish Handball Player of the Year. He holds the Danish record for most scored goals in a single international match by 15.

Playing career
Born in Viborg, Nikolaj Jacobsen moved with his parents to Southern Funen as a child, and began playing handball at the age of 11. He was a skilled association football player as well, and was among the most talented Danish youth football players, while also playing for the Denmark youth national handball team.

Having played youth handball at GOG Håndbold, Nikolaj Jacobsen made his senior debut for the club in 1990, at the age of 18. At GOG, Jacobsen played both centre backcourt and left wingman. He became known as a highly skilled player, able to score goals with wide variety of shots. In his second senior year, Jacobsen made his debut for the senior Denmark men's national handball team, under national team coach Anders Dahl-Nielsen. Under coach Bent Nyegaard, Jacobsen and GOG won the 1992 Danish Handball League, and the following year, Jacobsen was named Danish Handball Player of the Year. He helped GOG win the 1995 and 1996 Danish Handball Leagues, and became top goalscorer of the Danish 1997 season, with 205 goals scored.

In 1997, at the age of 26, Jacobsen moved to German Handball-Bundesliga team TSV Bayer Dormagen. Jacobsen scored 189 goals in 28 Bundesliga matches during the 1998 season, though Bayer Dormagen finished in 14th placed, and were eventually relegated. However, Jacobsen had caught the attention of reigning Bundesliga champions THW Kiel, and following one year at Bayer Dormagen, he moved on to Kiel.

At Kiel, Jacobsen was coached by German coach Zvonimir Serdarušić, and it was here he became one of the best left wingmen in the world. The temperamental Jacobsen was also taught to be a team player, by his new Swedish teammates Magnus Wislander, Staffan Olsson and Stefan Lövgren. When Jacobsen complained that Stefan Lövgren would not play him the ball, Lövgren replied: "When you talk nicely, you will get the ball." Jacobsen and Lövgren soon became close friends. In the following three seasons, Jacobsen scored 1015 goals in a total 142 games for Kiel, as the club won two Handball Bundesliga championships and two German Cup titles. Kiel also finished second in the international 1999–2000 EHF Champions League tournament, losing 52–54 on aggregate to FC Barcelona Handbol in the final.

On 27 September 1998, Jacobsen set a new record for most goals scored in a match for the Denmark national team, when he scored 15 goals against the Greece men's national handball team, in a qualification match for the 1999 World Handball Championship. Denmark won the game 33–20. The previous record of 14 goals in a game had been set by Flemming Hansen in 1971, and had been equalled by left wingman Lars Christiansen in another game against Greece, only four days before Jacobsen broke the record. Jacobsen was once again named Denmark Handball Player of the Year in 1999, and was selected for the 1999–2000 Bundesliga All-Star Team.

In the opening game of the 2001–02 Bundesliga season, Jacobsen injured his knee when he collided with the goalkeeper of opposing team SG Wallau/Massenheim. The injury became a recurring problem, and the following three seasons, Jacobsen played only 72 games, scoring 331 goals for Kiel. He still helped the club win another Bundesliga championship, as well as two international EHF Cup titles. The injury also meant, that Jacobsen was absent from the Denmark team which won bronze medals at the 2002 European Championship. Unable to fully recover from his injury, Jacobsen left Kiel in 2004 and moved back to Denmark to become player-coach.

Coaching career
Nikolaj Jacobsen moved to Viborg HK in the Danish Handball League; the club of his birth town of Viborg. While at Viborg HK, Jacobsen undertook a teacher education, and coached handball at Viborg HK's sports college. At Viborg HK, Jacobsen played under Danish head coach Ulrik Wilbek. When Wilbek left to coach the Denmark national handball team, Jacobsen became assistant coach to new head coach Søren Hildebrand, while still maintaining his active career. Jacobsen scored 71 goals in 28 league games for Viborg during his time at the club, but focused increasingly on his role as assistant coach. In Jacobsen's time at Viborg, the club finished runners-up in the 2007 Danish Handball League, and reached two Danish Cup finals.

In 2007, Jacobsen moved to rival Danish Handball League club Bjerringbro-Silkeborg Voel (BSV), to fill the role of assistant coach to Danish head coach Carsten Albrektsen. Jacobsen did also play a few games for BSV, scoring six goals in nine league matches. BSV finished runners-up twice and in third place once, in the five seasons Jacobsen spent with the club. During his time at BSV, Jacobsen clashed with management over coaching principles, and even considered ending his coaching career.

It was time for Jacobsen to become head coach, and he moved to Danish Handball League team Aalborg Håndbold in 2012. He brought former teammate Morten Bjerre with him, as assistant coach. In his first season at the club, Aalborg won the 2013 Danish Handball League, and finished runners-up in his second season. By then, Jacobsen had announced his intention to leave Aalborg in 2014.

Jacobsen joined German Handball-Bundesliga team Rhein-Neckar Löwen, replacing Icelandic coach Guðmundur Guðmundsson who had just become head coach of the Denmark national handball team. In his first season with Rhein-Neckar Löwen, Jacobsen led the team to finish runners-up in the Bundesliga. In his second year at the club, Löwen won the 2016 Bundesliga, their first Handball-Bundesliga championship, which also made Jacobsen the first Danish manager to win the Handball-Bundesliga. The following season, Löwen successfully reclaimed the Bundesliga championship.

In March 2017, Jacobsen was appointed head coach of the Denmark national handball team, while still coaching Rhein-Neckar Löwen. He replaced Guðmundur Guðmundsson as national coach for Denmark.

Honours

Player
EHF Cup:
: 2002, 2004
German Championship:
: 1999, 2000, 2002
German Cup:
: 1999, 2000
Danish Handball League:
: 1992, 1995, 1996

Manager
German Championship:
: 2016, 2017
: 2015
German Cup:
: 2018
Danish Championship:
: 2013
World Men's Handball Championship:
: 2019, 2021, 2023
European Men's Handball Championship:
: 2022
Olympic Games:
: 2020

Individual
Danish "Handball Player of the Year": 1993, 1999
IHF World Coach of the Year (male teams): 2021

References

External links

1971 births
Living people
Viborg HK players
THW Kiel players
Danish handball coaches
Danish male handball players
Expatriate handball players
Danish expatriate sportspeople in Germany
Handball-Bundesliga players
People from Viborg Municipality
Handball coaches of international teams
Sportspeople from the Central Denmark Region